Schiermonnikoog National Park is a national park in the Dutch province of Friesland. It was founded in 1989.

Landscape and history

The island arose during the last glacial period and its shape has been very variable since then. Dominant processes are sand drifting, erosion and sedimentation along the coasts, characteristic for a tidal landscape. In former times, only few people lived on the island, most fishermen. Around 1900, the state started forestry programs to prevent sand drifting. In addition, dikes were built to protect the island and its population. Some of the marshes were embanked in the course of time and transformed to polders for agriculture. During the 20th century tourism and recreation became more important and part of the island was designated as nature reserve. At present, we find dunes, forests, polders, tidal flats, marshes and beaches on the island, as well as a small lake and a village.

Flora and fauna
The island has a very rich fauna and flora.
In the dunes we find common hawthorn, the common sea-buckthorn, honeysuckle; on the marshes sea lavender, sea wormwood, sea aster and glasswort. Lichens and mushrooms can be found throughout the island, as well as many species of insects. On the marshes and tidal flats thousands of birds occur, such as common redshank, barnacle goose, spoonbill, hen harrier, oystercatcher, red knot, bar-tailed godwit, curlew and European herring gull. In the past the rabbit was very common, but because of the rabbit haemorrhagic disease (RHD), the species is rare now.
In the sea there are gray seal, common seal, eelgrass and many species of seaweeds.

Management 
Natuurmonumenten is responsible for the management of the national park and Rijkswaterstaat for coastal protection. One of the aims of the management is to make the dunes more dynamic. The bird colonies are protected through regulation of the numbers of visitors in spring and summer.

Recreation 
The island is a popular place to visit, especially the beaches. Because the island is isolated, because the use of cars by visitors is forbidden and because there are very few inhabitants and farmers on the island, it is one of the best protected Dutch national parks.
There is a visitors centre in the village of Schiermonnikoog. There is one campground and there are several hotels and restaurants.

References

External links 
 Official website

Protected areas established in 1989
1989 establishments in the Netherlands
National parks of the Netherlands
Ramsar sites in the Netherlands
Geography of Friesland
Tourist attractions in Friesland
Schiermonnikoog